Muhammad ibn Iyas (b. June 1448; d.1522/4) is one of the most important historians in modern Egyptian history. He was an eyewitness to the Ottoman invasion of Egypt. 

Of Circassian origin, he was one of the Memluks and was entitled Bada'I al-Zuhur fi Waqa'I al-Duhur.

His quotes have been used in many references like his statement about Al-Nasir Muhammad: "His name was mentioned everywhere like no other king's name. All the kings wrote to him, sent gifts to him and feared him. The whole of Egypt was in his grasp."

Work
Ibn Iyas was the author of a five-volume history of Egypt, totalling over 3,000 pages, entitled "Badāʼi al-zuhūr fī waqāʼi al-zuhūr".
ibn Iyas, 1921,    An account of the Ottoman conquest of Egypt in the year A.H. 922 (A.D. 1516)

References

External links

 Sotheby's October 9, 2013, auction of an autograph unicum of his Kitab 'aja'ib al-akhbar li-khutat misr al-amsar.

15th-century Egyptian historians
1448 births
1520s deaths
16th-century Egyptian historians
Egyptian historians of Islam
Circassian Mamluks
Scholars from the Mamluk Sultanate
Critics of Ibn Arabi